WISE J053516.80−750024.9 (designation abbreviated to WISE 0535−7500) is either a sub-brown dwarf or a free planet. It has spectral class ≥Y1 and is  located in constellation Mensa. It is estimated to be 47 light-years from Earth. 

In 2017, more accurate analysis found it to be a binary system made up of two substellar objects of spectral class≥Y1 in orbit less than one astronomical unit from each other.

Discovery
WISE 0535−7500 was discovered in 2012 by J. Davy Kirkpatrick et al. from data, collected by Wide-field Infrared Survey Explorer (WISE) Earth-orbiting satellite — NASA infrared-wavelength  space telescope, which mission lasted from December 2009 to February 2011. In 2012 Kirkpatrick et al. published a paper in The Astrophysical Journal, where they presented the discovery of seven new found by WISE brown dwarfs of spectral type Y, among which also was WISE 0535−7500.

Distance
Trigonometric parallax of WISE 0535−7500 is 0.070 ± 0.005 arcsec, corresponding to a distance of 14 pc and 47 ly.

Y dwarf
Brown dwarfs are defined as substellar objects that have at some time in their lives burnt deuterium in their interior. The borderline between a brown dwarf and a planet is conventionally taken to be 13 times the mass of Jupiter. All brown dwarfs are either M dwarfs, L dwarfs, T dwarfs or Y dwarfs, in order of decreasing temperature. An increasing number after the letter in the spectral type also means decreasing temperature, a Y2 dwarf is cooler than a Y1 dwarf is cooler than a Y0 dwarf. Planets can also be L dwarfs, T dwarfs or Y dwarfs.

References

Brown dwarfs
Y-type stars
Mensa (constellation)
20120509
WISE objects